For a Moment Freedom is a 2008 film, written and directed by Austrian-Iranian filmmaker Arash T. Riahi.

Synopsis
For a Moment Freedom tells of the odyssey of three Iranians groups of refugees: a married couple with a child, two young men with two children, and two men who are friends despite the differences between them.

They have all managed to escape from Iran and Iraq, but now they are stuck in the Turkish capital; although freedom is at last almost within their grasp, first they have to wait in a dubious hotel, hoping each day that their applications for asylum will be approved. This enforced break in their journey towards independence is characterised by both hope and utter uncertainty.

The young Austrian-Iranian filmmaker Arash T. Riahi depicts the plight of people trying to flee their homeland and the curious, transitory state of asylum-seekers with tragic comedy and great suspense.

Cast

Filming Locations

 Turkey
 Austria
 Germany

Prizes 

 2010 Tromsø International Film Festival's audience award
 Special Jury Award  and Special Audience Award at 10° European Cinema Festival Lecce
 Grande Premio Ficcao - Grand Prize for Best Movie and Premio do Público Ficcao - Publics Prize at the Amazonas Filmfestival/Manaus Brasil 
 Mejor Guion - Best Screenplay at 2. Festival Internacional San Luis Cine/Argentinian 
19. Festival International du Film D'Histoire-Pessac/France
 Prix du Jury Officiel - Main Award of the Jury, Prix du Jury étudiant - Student Award, Prix du Public - Publics Prize

For a Moment Freedom has won two more awards at the Festival du Cinéma Européen en Essonne in France. The film was awarded both the Public Award and the Student Award. This festival, which has been running for the last ten years, specializes in political films.

the Festival du Cinéma Européen en Essonne
 Best Austrian film 2008 at Viennale 08-International Filmfestival - Vienna Film award  
 
For a Moment Freedom won the Vienna Film Prize for the Best Austrian Film of the year at the 2008 Vienna Film Festival.

13è FESTIVAL INTERNATIONAL DES JEUNES REALISATEURS DE SAINT-JEAN-DE-LUZ
 Alain Poire Screenvision Award for Best Director

The prize is named after Alain Poire, the French producer who produced a large number of films, including works by Robert Bresson, Claude Autant-Lara and Yves Robert.

For a Moment Freedom was awarded the Golden Eye, the Award for the Best Debut Feature Film, at the 4th Zurich Film Festival by a jury headed by Peter Fonda. 
The Zurich Film Festival (ZFF) is one of the most important international festivals for young talent and is held annually in Zurich. The film festival is committed to promoting the works of young directors and screenwriters from all over the world.

Zurich Film Festival

At the renowned "A" festival, the World Film Festival in Montreal, For a Moment Freedom  has won an award for the best debut feature film, the Golden Zenith for the Best First Fiction Feature Film 2008.

References

External links 
 
 
 Les Film De Losagne - For a Moment Freedom
 Wega Film - For a Moment Freedom

2008 films
2000s English-language films
2000s Turkish-language films
2000s Persian-language films
Austrian drama films
French drama films
Turkish drama films
2008 drama films
Films about immigration
Films shot in Turkey
Films shot in Berlin
Films shot in Vienna
Films produced by Margaret Ménégoz
2008 directorial debut films
2008 multilingual films
Austrian multilingual films
French multilingual films
2000s French films